Philip David Hogarty (18 April 1988 – 1 January 2008) was chairman of the Irish Chess Union from September 2006 until his death in January 2008.

Career 
Hogarty began playing chess in 6th class in primary school at the age of 12.

In 2004 he won the Leinster Schools Under 16 Championship.

In 2005, he represented Leinster at the Inter-Provincials, playing as board 5 on the U19 team. In December that year, he finished unbeaten with 4.5 points out of 6 games in the Leinster Championships Challengers section. He finished in joint 2nd place.

In 2006, he played on the top board for DIT in the Irish Intervarsities helping them to achieve a third-place finish. After moving to the Rathmines Chess Club, he played on the top board in the Heidenfeld Memorial amassing 9 points out of 11 to finish as the competition's top scorer for the 2006/2007 season. He also came joint 2nd in the biggest tournament in Ireland, the Bunratty Chess Festival Major section. He finished unbeaten yet again, with 5/6. To round out 2006, he placed 4th in the season long ranking "Grand Prix" competition. This meant that Hogarty had the 4th best tournament results of the year in his section.

In 2007, in an achievement which was set to propel him to the upper echelons of Irish Chess, Philip was selected to play for Rathmines’ strongest team in Ireland's premier event the Armstrong Cup for the 2007/2008 season. At the halfway stage of this competition Philip had scored a very credible 4 points out of 6 against mainly expert opponents.

At the time of his death Philip had reached number 32 in the Irish Chess Union rating list.

His election in 2006 as chairman of the Irish Chess Union made him, at 18 years of age, the youngest person ever to be elected to this position.

Results

*This took into account the Leinster Challengers tournament from 2005, as this event took place in late December 2005

Personal life and death
Hogarty was born in Holles Street Hospital, Dublin, and raised in Baggot Street until in 1990, at the age of two, he moved to the suburb of Jobstown in Tallaght.

While crossing the Blessington Road in Tallaght at about 2:30 am on 1 January 2008, he was hit by a Garda car, and died shortly later. His funeral Mass was held in St. Thomas's church in Jobstown.

References

External links 
 Eulogy (ChessBase)
 Irish Independent article (Irish Independent)

1988 births
2008 deaths
Irish chess players
Sportspeople from Dublin (city)
Road incident deaths in the Republic of Ireland
Pedestrian road incident deaths
20th-century chess players